Spatial may refer to:
Dimension
Space
Three-dimensional space

See also